Andy Murray defeated the defending champion Novak Djokovic in the final, 7–6(12–10), 7–5, 2–6, 3–6, 6–2 to win the men's singles tennis title at the 2012 US Open. It was his first major title, and he became the first British man to win a major since Fred Perry in 1936, having been runner-up on four previous occasions. The final lasted 4 hours and 54 minutes, an Open Era record-equaling US Open final duration.

This tournament marked the last professional appearance of 2003 champion and former world No. 1 Andy Roddick. He lost to Juan Martín del Potro in the fourth round.

This tournament marked the first time since the 2004 French Open that neither Roger Federer nor Rafael Nadal (who withdrew from the tournament due to a knee injury) reached the semifinals of a major.

Seeds

Qualifying

Main draw

Finals

Top half

Section 1

Section 2

Section 3
{{16TeamBracket-Compact-Tennis5
| RD1=First round
| RD2=Second round
| RD3=Third round
| RD4=Fourth round

| RD1-seed01=3
| RD1-team01= A Murray
| RD1-score01-1=6
| RD1-score01-2=6
| RD1-score01-3=6
| RD1-seed02= 
| RD1-team02=
| RD1-score02-1=2
| RD1-score02-2=4
| RD1-score02-3=1

| RD1-seed03=Q
| RD1-team03= H Moriya
| RD1-score03-1=0
| RD1-score03-2=1
| RD1-score03-3=2
| RD1-seed04= 
| RD1-team04= I Dodig
| RD1-score04-1=6
| RD1-score04-2=6
| RD1-score04-3=6

| RD1-seed05=
| RD1-team05= T Bellucci
| RD1-score05-1=65
| RD1-score05-2=6
| RD1-score05-3=61
| RD1-score05-4=5
| RD1-seed06= 
| RD1-team06= P Andújar
| RD1-score06-1=77
| RD1-score06-2=3
| RD1-score06-3=77
| RD1-score06-4=7

| RD1-seed07= 
| RD1-team07= R Haase
| RD1-score07-1=3
| RD1-score07-2=5
| RD1-score07-3=2
| RD1-seed08=30
| RD1-team08= F López
| RD1-score08-1=6
| RD1-score08-2=7
| RD1-score08-3=6

| RD1-seed09=24
| RD1-team09= M Granollers
| RD1-score09-1=6
| RD1-score09-2=4
| RD1-score09-3=6
| RD1-score09-4=77
| RD1-seed10=WC
| RD1-team10= D Kudla
| RD1-score10-1=3
| RD1-score10-2=6
| RD1-score10-3=3
| RD1-score10-4=62

| RD1-seed11= 
| RD1-team11= L Lacko
| RD1-score11-1=5
| RD1-score11-2=2
| RD1-score11-3=6
| RD1-score11-4=3
| RD1-seed12=WC
| RD1-team12= J Blake
| RD1-score12-1=7
| RD1-score12-2=6
| RD1-score12-3=3
| RD1-score12-4=6

| RD1-seed13=PR
| RD1-team13= P-H Mathieu
| RD1-score13-1=2
| RD1-score13-2=4
| RD1-score13-3=77
| RD1-score13-4=77
| RD1-score13-5=6
| RD1-seed14= 
| RD1-team14= I Andreev
| RD1-score14-1=6
| RD1-score14-2=6
| RD1-score14-3=61
| RD1-score14-4=64
| RD1-score14-5=1

| RD1-seed15=
| RD1-team15= S Giraldo
| RD1-score15-1=3
| RD1-score15-2=6
| RD1-score15-3=6
| RD1-score15-4=4
| RD1-score15-5=4
| RD1-seed16=15
| RD1-team16= M Raonic
| RD1-score16-1=6
| RD1-score16-2=4
| RD1-score16-3=3
| RD1-score16-4=6
| RD1-score16-5=6

| RD2-seed01=3
| RD2-team01= A Murray
| RD2-score01-1=6
| RD2-score01-2=6
| RD2-score01-3=6
| RD2-seed02= 
| RD2-team02= I Dodig
| RD2-score02-1=2
| RD2-score02-2=1
| RD2-score02-3=3

| RD2-seed03= 
| RD2-team03= P Andújar
| RD2-score03-1=4
| RD2-score03-2=1
| RD2-score03-3=77
| RD2-score03-4=6
| RD2-score03-5=5
| RD2-seed04=30
| RD2-team04= F López
| RD2-score04-1=6
| RD2-score04-2=6
| RD2-score04-3=65
| RD2-score04-4=3
| RD2-score04-5=7

| RD2-seed05=24
| RD2-team05=
| RD2-score05-1=1
| RD2-score05-2=4
| RD2-score05-3=2
| RD2-seed06=WC
| RD2-team06= J Blake
| RD2-score06-1=6
| RD2-score06-2=6
| RD2-score06-3=6

| RD2-seed07=PR
| RD2-team07= P-H Mathieu
| RD2-score07-1=5
| RD2-score07-2=4
| RD2-score07-3=64
| RD2-seed08=15
| RD2-team08= M Raonic
| RD2-score08-1=7
| RD2-score08-2=6
| RD2-score08-3=77

| RD3-seed01=3
| RD3-team01=
| RD3-score01-1=77
| RD3-score01-2=77
| RD3-score01-3=4
| RD3-score01-4=77
| RD3-seed02=30
| RD3-team02= F López
| RD3-score02-1=65
| RD3-score02-2=65
| RD3-score02-3=6
| RD3-score02-4=64

| RD3-seed03=WC
| RD3-team03= J Blake
| RD3-score03-1=3
| RD3-score03-2=0
| RD3-score03-3=63
| RD3-seed04=15
| RD3-team04={{Nowrap| M Raonic}}
| RD3-score04-1=6| RD3-score04-2=6| RD3-score04-3=77'''

| RD4-seed01=3
| RD4-team01=

Section 4

Bottom half

Section 5

Section 6

Section 7

Section 8

References
Main Draw

External links
 Association of Tennis Professionals (ATP) – 2012 US Open Men's Singles draw

2012 US Open (tennis)
US Open (tennis) by year – Men's singles